Behala Girls' High School is a Bengali-medium girls' school located at Behala, Kolkata, India. This is a girls' school and is affiliated to the West Bengal Board of Secondary Education for Madhyamik Pariksha (10th Board exams), and to the West Bengal Council of Higher Secondary Education for Higher Secondary Examination (12th Board exams). The school was established in 1948. The school is maintained by National University of Educational Planning and Administration.

References 

High schools and secondary schools in West Bengal
Girls' schools in Kolkata
Educational institutions established in 1948
1948 establishments in West Bengal